Thomas Kokkinis (born 8 August 1971 in Rueil-Malmaison) is a French former professional footballer.

He played at the professional level in Ligue 1 for Paris Saint-Germain F.C. and FC Metz and in Ligue 2 for SC Bastia, Red Star Saint-Ouen and FC Rouen.

External links
 

1971 births
Living people
Association football goalkeepers
French footballers
Ligue 1 players
Ligue 2 players
Paris Saint-Germain F.C. players
SC Bastia players
Red Star F.C. players
FC Rouen players
FC Metz players
SAS Épinal players
AS Cherbourg Football players
Thonon Evian Grand Genève F.C. players
AS Poissy players
FC Mantois 78 players
Competitors at the 1993 Mediterranean Games
Mediterranean Games bronze medalists for France
Mediterranean Games medalists in football